NXIVM is the name commonly used to describe the personality cult of imprisoned racketeer and sex offender Keith Raniere. NXIVM is also the trademarked name of the defunct corporation that Raniere founded, which provided seminars and videos in the field of human potential development. The United States seized ownership of NXIVM related entities and their intellectual property through asset forfeiture following Raniere's conviction.

The NXIVM Corporation was based in the New York Capital District and had centers throughout the United States, Canada, and Mexico. The subsidiary companies of NXIVM recruited based on the multi-level marketing model and used curricula based on the intellectual property ("tech") of Raniere called "Rational Inquiry". Courses attracted a variety of notable students including actors as well as the children of the rich and powerful. At its height, NXIVM had 700 active members.

Over its existence, former members and families of NXIVM clients alarmed by Raniere's behavior and NXIVM's practices spoke to investigative journalists of Forbes, Vanity Fair, The New York Observer, and the Times Union of Albany calling the organization a "cult". The organization was criticized in similar terms by Rick Alan Ross of the Cult Education Institute and activists and academics from the anti-cult movement. In 2017, former members Sarah Edmondson, Bonnie Piesse and Mark Vicente, as well as Catherine Oxenberg (mother of member India Oxenberg) spoke to The New York Times and revealed grave concerns about Keith Raniere and NXIVM, including the existence of a secret society called "DOS" in which women were branded, made to record false confessions and provide nude photographs for blackmail.

Following the New York Times exposé, the United States Attorney for the Eastern District of New York investigated the organization, and in 2018 brought criminal charges against Raniere, co-founder Nancy Salzman and her daughter Lauren, actress Allison Mack, Seagram heiress Clare Bronfman, and bookkeeper Kathy Russell. The U.S. Attorney's Office argued in its Racketeer Influenced and Corrupt Organizations Act prosecution that NXIVM and its subsidiaries existed to promote, enhance and protect Raniere and members of the enterprise. The indictment alleges that Raniere and his co-defendants comprised an organized racketeering enterprise by recruiting others into NXIVM and DOS for financial and personal benefits and committed crimes ranging from sex trafficking to forced labor and visa and wire fraud. All defendants except for Raniere pled guilty.

Raniere chose to go to trial in 2019. Prosecutors revealed a decades-long pattern of grooming, sexual abuse of girls and women, physical and psychological punishments against dissenters, and hacking and vexatious litigation against enemies. Raniere was convicted on the top charge of racketeering and racketeering conspiracy as well as several other charges. Judge Nicholas Garaufis sentenced Raniere to 120 years imprisonment. Co-conspirators Clare Bronfman, Nancy Salzman, and Allison Mack were given lesser prison sentences. Lauren Salzman and Kathy Russell were each given non-prison sentences.

Following Raniere's conviction, he continues to direct a small set of loyal members from his prison cell, encouraging continued recruitment. At his direction, members of the group danced outside Raniere's jail and staged protests against individual prosecutors. Based on statements of support, it was estimated that about 50 to 60 persons remain loyal to Raniere.

History 

Before founding NXIVM, Raniere created Consumers Buyline, a business venture that the New York Attorney General accused of having been a pyramid scheme; Raniere signed a consent order in 1996 in which he denied any wrongdoing but agreed to pay a $40,000 fine and to be permanently banned from "promoting, offering or granting participation in a chain distribution scheme".

Founding and initial success
In 1998, Raniere and Nancy Salzman founded NXIVM, a personal development company offering "Executive Success Programs" (ESP) and a range of techniques for self-improvement. Raniere claimed that its "main emphasis is to have people experience more joy in their lives". In one account cited by former NXIVM member Sarah Edmondson, Raniere chose the name based on the ancient Roman system of debt bondage known as nexum. The 2002 registration with United States Patent and Trademark Office for the NXIVM trademark states that "The foreign wording in the mark translates into English as 'the next millennium'".

During NXIVM seminars, students would call Raniere and Salzman "Vanguard" and "Prefect", respectively. The Hollywood Reporter wrote that Raniere adopted the title from the 1981 video game Vanguard, "in which the destruction of one's enemies increased one's own power". Within the organization, the reasoning for the titles was that Raniere was the leader of a philosophical movement and Salzman was his first student.

By 2003, 3,700 people had taken part in ESP classes. Reported participants included businesswoman Sheila Johnson, former Surgeon General Antonia Novello, Enron executive Stephen Cooper, Ana Cristina Fox (daughter of former Mexican president Vicente Fox), entrepreneur Richard Branson (who denied having taken the classes), businessman Edgar Bronfman Sr., and actresses Linda Evans, Grace Park, and Nicki Clyne. In the early 2000s, Seagram heiresses Clare and Sara Bronfman, daughters of Edgar Bronfman Sr., became attached to the organization.

Cult allegations in early 2000s 

NXIVM claimed its training is a trade secret, subject to non-disclosure agreements, but reportedly uses a technique the organization calls "rational inquiry" to facilitate personal and professional development. In 2003, NXIVM sued the Ross Institute in the case known as NXIVM Corp. v. Ross Institute, alleging copyright infringement for publishing excerpts of content from its manual in three critical articles commissioned by cult investigator Rick Alan Ross and posted on his website. Ross posted a psychiatrist's assessment of NXIVM's "secret" manual on his website that called the regimen "expensive brainwashing".

Ross obtained the manual from former member Stephanie Franco, a co-defendant in the trial, who had signed a non-disclosure agreement not to divulge information from the manual to others. NXIVM filed suits in New York and New Jersey, but both were dismissed. On appeal, the United States Court of Appeals for the Second Circuit affirmed the dismissal, ruling that the defendant's critical analysis of material obtained in bad faith (i.e. in violation of a non-disclosure agreement) was fair use since the secondary use was transformative as criticism and was not a potential replacement for the original on the market.

In October 2003, Forbes published a critical article on NXIVM and Raniere. According to Vanity Fair, NXIVM leadership, who had spoken to Forbes, had expected a positive story. They were especially upset by remarks made by Bronfman, who told Forbes that he believed NXIVM was a cult and that he was troubled by his daughters' "emotional and financial investment" in it. In 2006, Forbes published an article about the Bronfman sisters, stating that they had taken out a line of credit to loan NXIVM $2 million, repayable through personal training sessions and phone consultations with Salzman. Another Forbes article in 2010 discussed the failures of commodities and real estate deals by the Bronfmans made on Raniere's advice.

Recruitment in Vancouver 
After actress Kristin Kreuk became involved with NXIVM in 2006, Salzman and her daughter Lauren, a junior NXIVM leader, went to Vancouver to recruit Kreuk's Smallville co-star Allison Mack. Lauren bonded with Mack (the two women eventually became Raniere's inner circle and his sexual partners). Kreuk, however, left NXIVM in 2013. Mack became "an enthusiastic proselytizer" for NXIVM, persuading her parents to take courses, and after wrapping production of Smallville in 2011, moved to Clifton Park, New York, to be near NXIVM's home base in Albany.

Clout in the New York Capital Region 
In 2008, the Bronfman sisters allegedly pressured Stephen Herbits, a confidant of their father, to ask Albany County District Attorney David Soares, New York Governor Eliot Spitzer, and New Jersey Attorney General Anne Milgram to begin criminal investigations into NXIVM's critics. NXIVM reportedly kept dossiers on Soares, Spitzer, political consultants Roger Stone and Steve Pigeon, U.S. Senator Chuck Schumer, and Albany Times Union publisher George Randolph Hearst III in a box in the basement of Nancy Salzman's home. According to the Times Union, NXIVM "developed a reputation for aggressively pursuing critics and defectors who broke from its ranks, including using litigation to punish critics of Raniere, the organization, or its training methods."

The World Ethical Foundations Consortium, an organization co-founded by Raniere and the Bronfman sisters, sponsored a visit to Albany by the Dalai Lama in 2009. The visit was initially canceled by the Dalai Lama owing to negative press about NXIVM, but was rescheduled; the Dalai Lama spoke at Albany's Palace Theatre in May 2009. In 2017, Lama Tenzin Dhonden, the self-styled "Personal Emissary for Peace for the Dalai Lama" who had arranged the appearance, was suspended from his position amid corruption charges; the investigation also revealed a personal relationship between Dhonden and Sara Bronfman, which began in 2009.

NXIVM has been described as a pyramid scheme, a sex-trafficking operation, a cult, and a sex cult. In a 2010 Times Union article, former NXIVM coaches characterized students as "prey" for Raniere's sexual or gambling-related proclivities. Kristin Keeffe, a longtime partner of Raniere and mother of his child, left the group in 2014 and called Raniere "dangerous", saying, "[a]ll the worst things you know about NXIVM are true."

Knife of Aristotle 
In 2014, Raniere founded the NXIVM-affiliated news organization The Knife of Aristotle, later known as The Knife and The Knife Media. The Knife of Aristotle was subsequently described as a fake news website and a cult. The organization also reportedly hired journalists in an attempt to gain media support and solicit new members to NXIVM, as well as fabricating staff members.

Exposure of "DOS" and NXIVM downfall 
Starting with reports by Frank Parlato in June 2017 and bolstered by an October 2017
article in The New York Times, details began to emerge about "Dominus Obsequious Sororium", a secret society of women that started in 2015 within NXIVM in which female members were allegedly called slaves, branded with the initials of Raniere and Mack, subjected to corporal punishment from their "masters", and required to provide nude photos or other potentially damaging information about themselves as "collateral". Law enforcement representatives have alleged that DOS members were forced into sexual slavery.

Whistleblowers' accounts 
Sarah Edmondson, a Canadian actress who had been an ESP participant since 2005, said that she left NXIVM after Mack inducted her into DOS the previous March at her Albany home. Edmondson alleged that participants were blindfolded naked, held down by Mack and three other women, and branded by NXIVM-affiliated doctor Danielle Roberts, using a cauterizing pen. Appearing on an A&E television program about cults, Edmondson provided additional context for the use of the "collateral" concept, saying that it was used in innocuous forms from the earliest, outermost stages of NXIVM in order to acclimate victims—for example, collateralizing small amounts of money that one might forfeit if one did not go to the gym one day. The New York Times later reported that hundreds of members left NXIVM after Edmondson went public about her experience.

On December 15, 2017, the ABC newsmagazine 20/20 aired an exposé including interviews with many former NXIVM adherents, including Edmondson and Catherine Oxenberg, who alleged that her daughter, India Oxenberg, was in danger from the group. Several former members reported financial and sexual predation by NXIVM leaders. Edmondson further appeared in "Escaping NXIVM", during the first season of the CBC podcast Uncover.

Seven socially prominent Mexican citizens, including Emiliano Salinas (son of former president Carlos Salinas de Gortari) and Ana Cristina Fox (daughter of former president Vicente Fox), Rosa Laura Junco, Loreta Garza Dávila (a business leader from Nuevo Leon), Daniela Padilla, Camila, and Mónica Durán, have been accused of involvement.

Arrest of Raniere 

In March 2018, Raniere was arrested and indicted on charges related to DOS, including sex trafficking, sex trafficking conspiracy, and conspiracy to commit forced labor. He was arrested in Mexico and held in custody in New York after appearing in federal court in Fort Worth, Texas. The indictment alleged that at least one woman was coerced into sex with Raniere, who forced DOS members to undergo the branding ritual alleged by Edmondson and others. United States Attorney Richard Donoghue stated that Raniere "created a secret society of women whom he had sex with and branded with his initials, coercing them with the threat of releasing their highly personal information and taking their assets".

Indictment of Raniere and co-conspirators 
On April 20, 2018, Mack was arrested and indicted on similar charges to Raniere's. According to prosecutors, after she recruited women into first NXIVM and then DOS, Mack coerced them into engaging in sexual activity with Raniere and performing menial tasks, for which Raniere allegedly paid her. Mack was further alleged to be DOS's second-in-command after Raniere. On April 24, Mack was released on $5 million bond pending trial and held under house arrest with her parents in California. On May 4, Raniere pleaded not guilty.

Salzman's home was raided shortly after Raniere's arrest, and prosecutors stated during his arraignment that further arrests and a superseding indictment for Raniere and Mack should be expected. In late May, authorities moved to seize two NXIVM-owned properties near Albany.

In April 2018, the New York Post reported that NXIVM had moved to Brooklyn, New York, and was being led by Clare Bronfman. On June 12, 2018, the Times Union reported that NXIVM had suspended its operations owing to "extraordinary circumstances facing the company". Bronfman was arrested on July 24 and charged with racketeering. She was released to house arrest after signing a $100 million bail bond. Also arrested and charged with the same crime were NXIVM President Nancy Salzman; her daughter, Lauren Salzman; and another NXIVM employee, Kathy Russell.

Guilty pleas, corporations and conviction

On March 13, 2019, Nancy Salzman pleaded guilty to a charge of racketeering criminal conspiracy. She agreed, as nominal owner, not to contest forfeiture of NXIVM-related assets including real estate as well as corporations that owned Keith Raniere and NXIVM's trademark and patent portfolio.

The same day as Nancy Salzman's plea, the court unsealed a second (and final) superseding indictment against Raniere and his codefendants, adding the charge that Raniere produced and kept child sexual abuse material of a girl who was 15 at the time.

Later in March 2019, Lauren Salzman pleaded guilty to racketeering and racketeering conspiracy; she later testified against Raniere and received leniency.

Sentencing documents for Allison Mack state that she entered proffer sessions on April 2, 2019. The government credited her for providing relevant emails, documents and recordings later used to convict Raniere. On April 8, 2019, Mack pleaded guilty to racketeering and racketeering conspiracy. Though not called to testify against Keith Raniere, prosecutors said that Mack, "was available to testify at Raniere’s trial if requested to do so."

On April 19, 2019, Bronfman pleaded guilty to charges of harboring an alien and identity fraud; bookkeeper Kathy Russell pleaded guilty to visa fraud.

The federal trial of Keith Raniere began on May 7, 2019. On June 19, 2019, the jury convicted him of all counts.

NXIVM after Raniere's conviction 
The assets of NXIVM were held by Nancy Salzman, including several corporate entities and titles to intellectual property. As part of her plea agreement with the government, Salzman did not contest asset forfeiture.

Following the conviction of Keith Raniere, members of the defunct organization split, with many speaking out against Raniere and the organization. A small number of NXIVM members continue to support Raniere and protest his innocence. Attorneys for Raniere submitted letters from 56 supporters requesting leniency for Raniere.

Civil lawsuit against NXIVM leadership 
In January 2020, Sarah Edmondson became lead plaintiff in a Racketeer Influenced and Corrupt Organizations Act civil suit filed in United States District Court for the Eastern District of New York accusing Raniere and 14 associates (including Nancy Salzman, Clare Bronfman, Sara Bronfman, Lauren Salzman, Allison Mack, Kathy Russell, Karen Unterreiner, Brandon Porter, Danielle Roberts, and Nicki Clyne) of conducting illegal psychological experiments on members of the company and abusing them physically, emotionally and financially.

Raniere and loyalists activities
In summer 2020, with the COVID-19 pandemic preventing in-person visitation to the Metropolitan Detention Center, Brooklyn, Raniere's remaining followers including actress Nicki Clyne began assembling to dance near the jail. Though they initially claimed to be entertaining all of the detainees, they were seen with a sign addressed to "Kay Rose," a name sharing Raniere's initials. The group began calling itself "The Forgotten Ones" and "We Are As You." Former NXIVM member turned prosecution witness Mark Vicente dismissed the group as a "cover movement" for support of Raniere.

While incarcerated, Raniere has maintained his leadership role over NXIVM, regularly communicating with his followers by phone and through TRULINCS email. A July 16, 2020, intelligence analysis memorandum from the Federal Bureau of Prisons' Counter Terrorism Unit states that Raniere instructed his follower Suneel Chakravorty to get more women to dance "erotically" outside of the MDC. In response, authorities at the MDC moved Raniere to another unit to keep the dancers out of his line of sight. A frustrated Raniere instructed his followers to help get him moved back by ingratiating themselves to prison staff, including offering coffee and donuts as they left their shifts.

Ahead of his sentencing, prosecutors submitted a number of Raniere's communications and disciplinary issues in prison as evidence of remorselessness and that he continues to control his followers. The communications included Raniere instructing his followers to have Alan Dershowitz, the attorney who successfully negotiated a non-prosecution agreement of the late Jeffrey Epstein, speak on his behalf; Dershowitz did not comment on the matter. Prosecutors also submitted documentation that Raniere and his follower Chakravorty used a false name and "burner phone" to evade detection, with Raniere instructing Chakravorty to "get scrutiny" on Judge Nicholas Garaufis, explaining that "the judge needs to know he's being watched".

Sentencing and appeals for Raniere and Bronfman 
On September 30, 2020, Judge Nicholas G. Garaufis of the United States District Court for the Eastern District of New York sentenced Clare Bronfman to six years and nine months in federal prison. The sentence was more severe than guidelines, with Garaufis stating that, "Raniere and his adherents appear to understand Ms. Bronfman’s continued loyalty—even after his trial and conviction, during which all the details of his sexual abuse and exploitation became known to the world."

Ronald S. Sullivan Jr., attorney for Bronfman, called the sentence "an abomination." Sullivan filed notice of appeal on October 7, 2020. Bronfman may only appeal the sentence, as she has forfeited the right to appeal her conviction as part of her plea.

Bronfman initially served her sentence in Federal Detention Center, Philadelphia. She is presently imprisoned at Federal Correctional Institution, Danbury.

On October 27, 2020, federal judge Nicholas Garaufis sentenced Raniere to a prison term of 120 years (effectively a life sentence) in prison and fined him $1.75 million. Attorneys for Keith Raniere gave notice of appeal of both his conviction and sentence on November 4, 2020.

In January 2021, Raniere was transferred from Metropolitan Detention Center, Brooklyn to begin serving his 120-year sentence. The Federal Bureau of Prisons first transferred him temporarily to United States Penitentiary, Lewisburg, a medium-security penitentiary, followed by a transfer to his permanent prison at United States Penitentiary, Tucson. The facility in Tucson, Arizona is noted as the sole facility in the federal prison system that is both specially-designated for sex offenders and also at maximum-security level.

In a hearing on restitution claims against Raniere, criminal defense attorney Marc Fernich represented Keith Raniere and stated that Bronfman had paid his fee.

Oral arguments on both Raniere and Bronfman's appeals were heard before the United States Court of Appeals for the Second Circuit on May 3, 2022. On December 9, 2022, the federal appeals court upheld the convictions and sentences for Keith Raniere and Clare Bronfman.

Marc Elliot v. Lions Gate Entertainment libel case 
In 2021, Raniere supporter Marc Elliot filed a lawsuit against Lions Gate Entertainment in the United States District Court for the Central District of California, alleging that the  Starz network documentary Seduced: Inside the NXIVM Cult libelled and defamed him. Joseph Tully, the attorney who represented Elliot, also represented Raniere in his appeals. The court dismissed the lawsuit and ordered the Plaintiff to pay Lions Gate Entertainment's attorneys' fees and costs, find that the documentary did "imply that Plaintiff was a devoted member of an organization whose leader has been implicated in a range of serious sexual crimes, but this assertion – however unflattering – is substantially true."

Raniere v. Garland prison case 
In May 2022, Keith Raniere filed suit against the U.S. Department of Justice and Bureau of Prisons, alleging that his civil rights are violated as a prisoner in United States Penitentiary, Tucson. Raniere sought an injunction allowing visitation and phone calls from follower Suneel Chakravorty, who he claims is a paralegal working on his appeals. The Department of Justice, Bureau of Prisons and authorities at USP Tucson moved to deny the injunction, on grounds that Chakravorty is not a paralegal but merely "an ardent former ESP and NXIVM coach with whom [Raniere] is banned from associating."

Judge Raner Collins granted the Department of Justice's motion to dismiss the suit on grounds that Raniere failed to exhaust administrative remedies (in line with the Prison Litigation Reform Act), and his lawyer's insufficient service of process.

Personality cult of Keith Raniere 
NXIVM has been described as a cult and Raniere a cult leader by anti-cult activists such as Rick Alan Ross and Steven Hassan, as well as the billionaire businessman Edgar Bronfman Sr. Stephen A. Kent, a sociologist who studies new religious movements, in an article that compares NXIVM with Scientology, noted that NXIVM operated mainly as a business and never incorporated as a religious organization. When comparing the distinctions between cults and religions, cult expert Janja Lalich stated: "A legitimate religion is going to have you worshipping a higher source. You're not expected to worship the living being in front of you or the writings of some living being." Characteristics associated with cults include: the group is elitist, claiming a special, exalted status for itself, its leader, and its members (e.g. the leader is considered the Messiah, a special being, an avatar—or the group and the leader is on a special mission to save humanity).

Hagiographical claims 
Over the decades, NXIVM emphasized Raniere's specialness through hagiography. A complaint from a 2020 lawsuit by former members of NXIVM recapitulated several fantastical claims made in marketing materials about Raniere. These claims, the complaint states, were all false.

 A child prodigy capable of speaking in complete sentences at the age of one year old; 
 A genius intellect in grade school who mastered college level mathematics; 
 An elite athlete who won judo and track tournaments.

Every August, NXIVM members would gather in Silver Bay, New York, to celebrate Raniere's birthday, known as "Vanguard Week", which began as a single day and eventually expanded to 11 days. The event included "tribute ceremonies" to Raniere by NXIVM members.

As established by prosecutors, according to several sources, including former high-ranking members of NXIVM, Raniere's word is final within NXIVM, and nothing of import happens within NXIVM without Raniere's approval. NXIVM students are taught that Raniere is the smartest and most ethical man in the world. Raniere frequently cited having earned three degrees from Rensselaer Polytechnic Institute. A review of his transcript shows that he graduated with a 2.26 GPA, having failed or barely passed many of the upper-level math and science classes he bragged about taking.

Claims of Raniere's superior intellect and sexual powers 
Well before co-founding NXIVM, Keith Raniere made fantastical claims about his intelligence. In June 1988, the Times Union profiled Raniere, reporting on his membership in the Mega Society after he achieved a high score on founder Ronald K. Hoeflin's MEGA test, an unsupervised, 48-question test published in the April 1985 issue of Omni magazine. Although the MEGA test has been widely criticized as not having been properly validated, the 1989 edition of the Guinness Book of World Records (the last to include a category for highest IQ) described the Hoeflin Research Group as "the most exclusive ultrahigh IQ society", and the 1989 Australian edition identified Raniere, Marilyn vos Savant, and Eric Hart as the highest-scoring members of the group.

The 2003 Forbes exposé of NXIVM and Raniere showed that Raniere continued to make the claim of being the world's most intelligent man, with the addition of being "the most ethical." By the time of a 2012 Times Union article, these claims had extended to Raniere convincing some in NXIVM that "his intellectual energy sets off radar detectors."

At Raniere's trial, testimony revealed that Raniere had convinced several girls and women that sex with him could heal their purported "disintegrations," and that his semen had supernatural qualities. Raniere instructed one sexual partner to seek out a virgin because he needed a "pure vessel" for reasons "energy-related and DNA-wise."

NXIVM's beliefs and practices

In a 2003 mission statement on the NXIVM website:NXIVM embodies a set of consistent and universal principles in which all humans can participate. These principles - apart from any mystical or religious notions - allow for life to persist and uphold a diversity of beliefs. By creating a new understanding, we can actualize our potential to live and work together and consequently bring human existence to a whole new level. Yet this cannot be done without first raising human awareness, fostering an ethical humanitarianism, and celebrating what it truly means to be human - and this is our mission.
In a transcript and audio of Clare Bronfman's testimony in a bankruptcy proceeding, Bronfman described the organization as a part of the Human Potential Movement.

Teachings 
The oldest program of NXIVM, Executive Success Programs, had students recite a "Twelve-point Mission Statement", pledging to "purge" themselves "of all parasite and envy-based habits", to enroll others, and to "ethically control as much of the money, wealth and resources of the world as possible within my success plan." The Mission Statement also labeled students who shared Executive Success Programs materials as "breaking a promise and breaching my contract", and compromising "inner honesty and integrity."

The doctrine of the NXIVM organization, "Rational Inquiry method", was treated as Raniere's scientific invention by and submitted to multiple patent offices.

NXIVM taught that some people, called "Suppressives", try to impede progress within NXIVM. People who irrevocably turned against Raniere were said to have undergone "The Fall" and were labeled, in the words of a former member, as "Luciferians, lost people for whom bad feels good, and good feels bad." Some members of NXIVM's inner circle were reportedly taught that, in past lives, they were high-ranking Nazis.

Classes and programs 
NXIVM conducted "Intensives," classes conducted for 12 hours daily for 16 days. One cited price was $7,500. Classes were divided into modules. In one module, "Relationship Sourcing", students were instructed to explore the benefits they would receive in the event of a partner's sudden death. Another module, "Dracula and his ghouls", reportedly discussed psychopaths and their followers. Other module titles included "Best People; Perfect World" and "The Heroic Struggle".

NXIVM has been associated with several related organizations. Jness was a society aimed at women, while the Society of Protectors was aimed primarily at men. A third group was known by the acronym DOS, short for "Dominus Obsequious Sororium", which, according to one member, means "master over slave women". In 2006, Raniere founded Rainbow Cultural Garden, an international chain of childcare organizations in which children were to be exposed to seven different languages.

Rituals and practices 
Classes by NXIVM had a number of idiosyncratic practices, described within the Rational Inquiry patent as "rules and rituals" and third-party sources as including:
 Rules and rituals: Rational Inquiry prescribes students to perform a number of gestures including a handshake, bowing, and handclap. Greetings included both a common handshake and an "ESP" or "NXIVM" handshake. In the second episode of The Vow Raniere suggests these elements are intentionally strange, telling his students, "We put rules and rituals up front to be the guardian at the gate. We want some people to say 'I don't want anything to do with this.'"
 Stripe path: Sashes or scarves were implemented in a ranking system similar to colored belts in martial arts. The sashes or scarves came in different colors and patterns symbolizing contribution to the Executive Success mission.
 Tribute: The Rational Inquiry patent indicates that "pictures of the founders may be displayed to show respect and to give tribute." Classes ended with students expressing gratitude to Keith Raniere (as "Vanguard") and Nancy Salzman (as "Prefect").
 Exploration of Meaning (EM's): Described as "therapy by number", the "exploration of meaning" involved a senior member questioning participants as they delved into their childhood memories.

Tourette's treatment claims
A 2018 documentary film directed by Alessandro Molatore showcases a purported study of the use of NXIVM's exploration of meaning technique to treat Tourette syndrome. The film is executive produced by Clare Bronfman. The film identifies the Tourette's study's "lead researcher" as Dr. Brandon Porter, at the time a hospitalist at St. Peter's Hospital in Albany.

In the sentencing of Clare Bronfman, prosecutors from the United States Attorney for the Eastern District of New York wrote, "the participants in this 'study' have expressed significant distress at their involvement" and offered one victim impact statement from a Tourette's study's participant said that the study "did nothing for me except ruin my self-esteem, ruin my mental health, and made me hate myself. It did not cure my Tourette’s in any way."

The purported treatment for Tourette syndrome was noted by one reporter as not having been tested in a scientific peer-reviewed setting. Another reporter reached out to NXIVM member Marc Elliot, who promotes both the purported treatment and film, and did not receive a reply. Dr. Alan Jern, Associate Professor of Psychology at Rose–Hulman Institute of Technology, wrote in Psychology Today that "[d]espite NXIVM’s obsession with being taken seriously by influential people and mainstream institutions, their penchant for secrecy and refusal to follow the norms of science means that their research was scientifically pretty worthless."

Human subject experimentation
Another purported study Porter conducted within the NXIVM community was described as watching disturbing footage, including video of people being murdered, while their brainwaves, physiological activity, facial and auditory responses and was recorded through electroencephalography, galvanic skin response. and video recording. 
The purported study is similar to a patent Raniere filed, "Determination of whether a luciferian can be rehabilitated":One example of a test to determine whether a person is a Luciferian comprises a video clip of an ice skater performing in a competition. Everything goes flawlessly until, at the very end, a mistake is made during a jump and the skater falls to the ice—all hope of winning the event is gone. A Luciferian will experience pleasure and satisfaction from this. Accordingly, the Luciferian's neurophysiological processes will register pleasure over the skater's misfortune which may be identified and quantified using the medical instrumentation. On the other hand, a non-Luciferian will feel sympathetic and empathize with the unfortunate skater. Unlike the Luciferian, a non-Luciferian's neurophysiological processes will not register as pleasure for this stimulus.
Several subjects complained to the New York State Board of the Office of Professional Medical Conduct about the experiments. Porter faced 24 professional conduct charges, including "moral unfitness to practice medicine". In August 2019, the New York State Department of Health suspended Porter's license to practice medicine in the state, finding that he conducted studies without an appropriate human research review committee.

Notable NXIVM participants 
Edgar Boone, the scion of a wealthy family, introduced NXIVM to numerous affluent Mexicans, becoming head of NXIVM-Mexico and rising to third in the NXIVM organization.

Clare Bronfman, daughter of billionaire Seagrams chairman Edgar Bronfman Sr., was introduced to NXIVM by her sister Sara. Clare Bronfman was arrested by federal agents on July 24, 2018, in New York City and charged with money laundering and identity theft in connection with NXIVM activities. She pleaded not guilty in the United States District Court for the Eastern District of New York in Brooklyn. She was released on $100 million bond and placed on house arrest with electronic monitoring. On April 19, 2019, Clare Bronfman pleaded guilty to conspiracy to conceal and harbor illegal aliens for financial gain and fraudulent use of identification; she faced 21 to 27 months in prison and has agreed to forfeit $6 million. On September 30, 2020, she was sentenced to six years, nine months in prison by a federal judge.

Sara Bronfman, daughter of Edgar Bronfman Sr., was introduced to NXIVM by a family friend in 2002.

Pam Cafritz, daughter of Washington, D.C., socialites Buffy and William Cafritz. Cafritz was a founder of JNESS, a Raniere-affiliated women's group. Cafritz was reported to be Raniere's "most important long-term girlfriend".  On November 7, 2016, Pam Cafritz died. After her death, her credit card was charged for over $300,000.

Suneel Chakravorty, a software developer, remained among Raniere's post-conviction followers, dancing outside the jail where Raniere is confined.

Nicki Clyne is a Canadian actress known for her role on the series Battlestar Galactica. According to reports, in 2006, Clyne became involved with NXIVM. She married fellow senior member Allison Mack in 2017; the marriage was alleged to have been a sham to evade United States immigration laws. After Raniere's conviction, Clyne and others began dancing nightly outside the detention center containing Raniere.

Marc Elliot, an author, claims taking courses through NXIVM and working with Keith Raniere and Nancy Salzman have helped him overcome his Tourette syndrome. He is among the NXIVM members who remain loyal to Raniere.

Allison Mack is an American actress known for her role on the series Smallville. Mack was reportedly recruited to the Vancouver chapter of NXIVM, along with her Smallville co-star Kristin Kreuk. Mack was reportedly a founder of DOS, a Raniere-affiliated Master/Slave group. Mack was arrested on April 20, 2018, on charges of sex trafficking, sex trafficking conspiracy, and forced labor conspiracy. Mack pleaded guilty to racketeering and racketeering conspiracy charges in April 2019, and was to be sentenced in September 2019. However, on July 15, 2019, the Senior U.S. District Judge Nicholas Garaufis postponed the sentencing until further notice to allow federal probation officials to conduct presentencing investigations. On June 30, 2021, Mack was sentenced to three years in prison.

Brandon Porter, a medical doctor, conducted unlicensed human-subjects research on 200 people for NXIVM. During a "fright study", Porter exposed subjects to disturbing videos, including actual footage of a decapitation. In 2016, Porter was present at a NXIVM retreat ("V-Week") where 300 to 400 individuals were struck by an unidentified disease; Porter failed to report the outbreak, in violation of his duties as a licensed medical doctor. Porter was stripped of his medical license in 2020.

Keith Raniere, founder of NXIVM, arrested and indicted on a variety of charges related to DOS (a "secret sisterhood" within NXIVM), including sex trafficking, sex trafficking conspiracy, and conspiracy to commit forced labor in March 2018. He was found guilty of all charges at trial. On October 27, 2020, Raniere was sentenced to 120 years in prison.

Danielle Roberts, an osteopathic physician, gained notoriety for having used a cauterizing pen to brand 17 women in connection with the group known as DOS. In 2020, New York Board of Medical Conduct began an investigation into Roberts; a year later it brought charges against her with the possibility of the revocation of her license. After Raniere's conviction, Roberts was among the dancers outside the jail in which he was incarcerated. Roberts' medical license was revoked in October 2021.

Emiliano Salinas is a venture capitalist and businessman. He is the son of former Mexican president Carlos Salinas de Gortari. Salinas served as vice president of Prorsus Capital, a financial consortium with ties to Raniere and NXIVM.

Nancy Salzman, a psychiatric nurse and trained practitioner of hypnotism and neuro-linguistic programming, met Raniere in 1998. The two founded Executive Success Programs, a personal development company offering a range of techniques aimed at self-improvement. In March 2019, Salzman pleaded guilty to racketeering. In September 2021, Salzman was sentenced to 42 months in prison and a $150,000 fine for racketeering conspiracy.

Karen A. Unterreiner is a member who became Raniere's live-in partner beginning in the 1980s and an early employee of his company Consumers' Buyline.

Critical former members
Barbara Bouchey was a client of Nancy Salzman, having been referred to her in 1988. Beginning in 2000, Bouchey dated Raniere. In 2009, Bouchey and eight other women ("The NXIVM Nine") confronted Raniere with concerns about abuse within the organization. That year, Bouchey left the group and later went to law enforcement.

Sarah Edmondson is a Canadian actress. After leaving NXIVM in early 2017, she publicly denounced the organization, claiming that she was invited into DOS, a substructure within NXIVM operated by Keith Raniere and Allison Mack, and was branded with a combination of Raniere's and Mack's initials at Mack's Albany home. Edmondson showed the brand in a New York Times exposé of NXIVM.

Kristin Keeffe became Raniere's partner in the early 1990s. In 2013, Keeffe gave birth to Raniere's son Gaelyn. In February 2014, Keeffe broke with Raniere and his group. Fleeing the region with her son, an email bearing Keeffe's name explained: "I have full sole legal custody of Gaelyn. Keith was experimenting on him. I had to get Gaelyn away." Keeffe publicly described Raniere as "dangerous". In 2015, Keeffe alleged that NXIVM leaders had planned to lure critics to Mexico with an invitation to an anti-cult conference; once in Mexico, the critics were to be arrested on false charges by order of a judge who had been bribed.

Toni Natalie met Raniere in 1991 when he was pitching his business Consumer's Buyline. Natalie and her then-husband became top sellers for the organization. Natalie recalled that she was able to stop smoking after a two-hour session with Raniere. Natalie and her son later moved to be near Raniere; her marriage ended shortly thereafter. Natalie and Raniere dated for the next eight years. In the mid-90s, Raniere and Natalie operated a health-food store in Clifton Park, NY. In 1999, Raniere's eight-year relationship with Natalie ended. Natalie would subsequently claim to have been the victim of harassment. In a January 2003 ruling, federal judge Robert Littlefield implied Raniere was using a legal suit to harass Natalie. Wrote Littlefield: "This matter smacks of a jilted fellow's attempt at revenge or retaliation against his former girlfriend, with many attempts at tripping her up along the way." In 2011, Natalie filed documents in federal court alleging that she had been repeatedly raped by Raniere.

Joseph J. O'Hara was an attorney who departed NXIVM in 2005 after accusing the group of misdeeds. In 2007, O'Hara was indicted by Albany County. It was later revealed that the District Attorney had allowed Raniere's girlfriend Kristin Keeffe to operate within its office as a sort of victims' advocate. Charges were ultimately dismissed.

India Oxenberg, daughter of actress Catherine Oxenberg, was introduced to the group in 2011. At Raniere's trial, a witness testified that India had spent a year on a 500-calorie-per-day diet. In May 2017, India admitted to her mother that she was among those who had been branded. India left the group in June 2018, after Raniere's arrest. In August 2018, Catherine Oxenberg's book Captive: A Mother's Crusade to Save Her Daughter from a Terrifying Cult was published.

Mark Vicente, a filmmaker known for the 2004 film What the Bleep Do We Know!?, began involvement with the group in 2005. Vicente testified against Raniere at his 2019 trial.

Journalists and bloggers
James Odato is an investigative reporter who wrote for the Albany Times Union. In 2012, Odato reported Raniere's history of pedophilia. In October 2013, Odato was named in a lawsuit filed by NXIVM, along with Suzanna Andrews of Vanity Fair  and blogger John J. Tighe; all had written critically of the group. The suit alleged that NXIVM computers had been illegally accessed.  Shortly thereafter, Odato was described as being "on leave" from the Times Union. Following Keith Raniere's sentencing in 2020, the editorial board of the New York Daily News praised Odato's work exposing NXIVM for its prescience, taking the unusual step of commending the work published by a competitor.

Frank Parlato was hired by NXIVM in 2007 to help with publicity. After concluding that NXIVM members were being defrauded by Raniere, Parlato began blogging about the group on his sites ArtVoice, The Niagara Falls Reporter, and The Frank Report.

Rick Alan Ross is the executive director of the Ross Institute, which specializes in studying cults. Ross received a copy of a NXIVM training manual and published portions of it on his website. In NXIVM Corp. v. Ross Institute, NXIVM sued to try to block further publications. Courts ruled in favor of Ross.

John Tighe wrote about NXIVM on a blog. In 2013, NXIVM accused Tighe of illegally accessing NXIVM servers using a former member's login information. Tighe's home was raided by the New York State Police, and his computer was seized.

Films, documentaries and books

Documentaries
 A&E Investigates: Cults and Extreme Belief aired its premier 1 hour episode, "NXIVM", featuring interviews of former members Sarah Edmondson and Mark Vicente, on May 28, 2018.
 Investigation Discovery released a two-hour special, The Lost Women of NXIVM on June 20, 2019.
 HBO released a docuseries about NXIVM titled The Vow; it premiered on August 23, 2020.
 Starz released a docuseries about NXIVM titled Seduced: Inside the NXIVM Cult; it premiered on October 18, 2020.
 NXIVM was the subject on an episode E! True Hollywood Story comprising interviews from several journalists and the people that were once involved with the organization including Catherine Oxenberg, Sarah Edmondson, and actor and Oxenberg's real-life friend Callum Blue.
 CNBC aired an episode of American Greed titled "Nightmare at NXIVM" on January 25, 2021.
 NBC aired a Dateline special on February 26, 2021, featuring an interview with Keith Raniere.

Books

Other
 The Canadian Broadcasting Corporation released a podcast in 2018 on NXIVM as part of CBC season 1 of the series Uncover.
NBC aired Law & Order: Special Victims Unit: Season 20, Episode 5 entitled “Accredo” based on the details of this cult. The episode aired October 18, 2018.
 Catherine Oxenberg produced a film for Lifetime about her daughter's experiences with NXIVM. It is titled Escaping the NXIVM Cult: A Mother's Fight to Save Her Daughter and aired on September 21, 2019. While Catherine Oxenberg served as the narrator and executive producer, the film starred Andrea Roth as Catherine Oxenberg, Peter Facinelli as Keith Raniere, and Sara Fletcher as Allison Mack.
 India Oxenberg wrote and narrated an audio book memoir, Still Learning, about her time in, and escape from, NXIVM.
 The BBC World Service program Outlook aired a four-part series on NXIVM in May and June 2021.

References

External links
 Website of Keith Raniere
 Three critical articles pertaining to the NXIVM v. Ross Institute lawsuit
 Times Union Special Report on NXIVM
 
 

 
1998 establishments in New York (state)
Colonie, New York
Companies based in Albany County, New York
Companies established in 1998
Cults
Large-group awareness training
Defunct multi-level marketing companies
Privately held companies based in New York (state)
Sex trafficking
Sexual misconduct allegations